Armudlu (also, Armutlu) is a village in the Qakh Rayon of Azerbaijan.  The village forms part of the municipality of Qaşqaçay.

References 

Populated places in Qakh District

av:Генуб